Camp Horno is a camp at Marine Corps Base Camp Pendleton in San Diego County, California.  It is the home of the 1st Marine Regiment, sometimes known as "Inchon".

History 
The camp was built in 1950 at the start of the Korean War and named for the Spanish word for clay oven or kiln.  Camp Horno initially consisted of Quonset huts that were typical housing for Marines until the 1970s.  In 2008 four-story, 170-room barracks were built as part of a facilities renovation project.  Parts of Katy Perry's "Part of Me" music video where shot at Camp Horno in 2012.  Camp Horno is the frequent site of many Marine ceremonies due to the history of the 1st Marine Regiment and the unit's frequent deployments to combat zones.  In January 2014, the regiment celebrated its 100th anniversary at the camp during a ceremony directed by Col. Peter Baumgarten, the regiment's commanding officer and a Marine whose first tour of duty was at Camp Horno in 1988.

O'Neil Shooting 
In February, 2004, Kimberley D. O'Neal was found shot to death in a park at Camp Horno. Gunnery Sgt. Archie O'Neil Jr. of 2nd Battalion, 1st Marine Regiment (based in Camp Horno) was arrested before deploying with his unit to Kuwait.

Horno Fire 
A fire in October 2007 dubbed the "Horno Fire" burned over 20,000 acres in the area around Camp Horno.  It was reported to be the worst fire ever at Camp Pendleton but there were no injuries.

References 

Horno
Military facilities in San Diego County, California
North County (San Diego County)
Military installations in California
Military installations established in 1950
1950 establishments in California